Erin Lake is a lake in Sibley County, in the U.S. state of Minnesota.

Formally named Mud Lake, the city voted to rename the lake after Erin Farber, to which it is now known as Erin Lake.

See also
List of lakes in Minnesota

References

Lakes of Minnesota
Lakes of Sibley County, Minnesota